Maruja is a Filipino comic book character created by Mars Ravelo. 
It is about an immortal love story about two people whose love for each other transcended a century. Written by Mars Ravelo and illustrated by Rico Rival, it was a story that dealt with reincarnation, beginning with the ill-fated love story of Maruja and Gabriel during the Spanish era and ending with their reunion one hundred years later.

Synopsis
Maruja and Gabriel were madly in love with each other but Maruja's parents disapproved of their relationship because of their class differences. Maruja was forced to marry Rodrigo, the captain of the civil guards, to ensure their fortune. But right after the marriage, the same night, she took her own life with a promise to Gabriel that they would be reunited someday. One hundred years later, Maruja was reincarnated as Cristy. She sees flashes from the past, memories that are not hers. She connects all the pieces together and was finally reunited with an aged and dying Gabriel.

In other media

Films
"Maruja", the 1967 film, starred Susan Roces with Romeo Vasquez. Roces played both Nina Concepcion and Maruja.
The 1978 remake "Gumising Ka Maruja" was a suspense thriller. It starred Phillip Salvador and Susan Roces reprised the title role.
The 1996 remake starred Carmina Villaroel and Rustom Padilla (now known as BB Gandanghari).

Television
The 2009 television series Komiks Presents: Nasaan Ka Maruja? starred Kristine Hermosa. The series was supposed to be Sheryl Cruz' comeback but due to her transfer to another network she was replaced by Hermosa.

Collected editions

References

External links

Fictional Filipino people
Female characters in comics
Philippine comics adapted into films
Filipino comics characters